The Rest Is Noise: Listening to the Twentieth Century is a 2007 nonfiction book by the American music critic Alex Ross, first published by Farrar, Straus and Giroux. It recounts the history of European and American music, starting in 1900, and highlights many examples. According to Grove Music Online, the book was intended to "open musical discourse to the broader educated public".

The Rest is Noise was also on the New York Times list of the ten best books of 2007 and was a finalist for the Pulitzer Prize for General Nonfiction. The book was shortlisted for the 2008 Samuel Johnson Prize for nonfiction.

References

External links
 
 Book summary from goodreads

Music books
2007 non-fiction books